This is a list of barrages and headworks in Pakistan.

Khyber Pakhtunkhwa

Punjab

Sindh

See also
List of dams and reservoirs in Pakistan
List of canals in Pakistan

References

External links
 Barrages in Pakistan - at Pakistan Tourism Portal
 Headworks  in Pakistan - at Pakistan Tourism Portal

Pakistan
Dams and reservoirs